The Journal of Classical Sociology is a quarterly peer-reviewed academic journal covering all aspects of classical sociology. The editors-in-chief are Bryan S. Turner (City University of New York) and Simon Susen (City University London). The journal was established in 2001 and is currently published by SAGE Publications.

Abstracting and indexing 
The journal is abstracted and indexed in:
 Academic Search Premier
 Applied Social Sciences Index & Abstracts
 Scopus

External links 
 

SAGE Publishing academic journals
English-language journals
Sociology journals
Quarterly journals
Publications established in 2001